Whitehouse and Whitton Division, Suffolk is an electoral division of Suffolk which returns two county councillors to Suffolk County Council. It is located in the North West Area of Ipswich and consists of Whitehouse  Ward and Whitton Ward of Ipswich Borough Council as well as part of Castle Hill Ward in the North West Area, Ipswich.

References

Electoral Divisions of Suffolk